Mont Buxton is an administrative district of Seychelles located on the island of Mahé.

References

Districts of Seychelles
Victoria, Seychelles